Solari Bay (‘Zaliv Solari’ \'za-liv so-'la-ri\) is the 11.2 km wide bay indenting for 4.5 km Nordenskjöld Coast in Graham Land north of Balvan Point and south of the east extremity of Richard Knoll.  It was formed as a result of the break-up of Larsen Ice Shelf in the area in the late 20th century, and subsequent retreat of Drygalski Glacier.  The feature is named after the settlement of Solari in Northern Bulgaria.

Location

Maps
 Antarctic Digital Database (ADD). Scale 1:250000 topographic map of Antarctica. Scientific Committee on Antarctic Research (SCAR). Since 1993, regularly upgraded and updated.

References
 Solari Bay. SCAR Composite Antarctic Gazetteer.
 Bulgarian Antarctic Gazetteer. Antarctic Place-names Commission. (details in Bulgarian, basic data in English)

External links
 Solari Bay. Copernix satellite image

Bays of Graham Land
Nordenskjöld Coast
Bulgaria and the Antarctic